The Body & the Soul is an album by trumpeter Freddie Hubbard recorded in 1963 as his second and last release on the Impulse! label.  It features performances by Hubbard with an orchestra and string section, and with a septet featuring Curtis Fuller, Eric Dolphy, Wayne Shorter, Cedar Walton, Reggie Workman and Louis Hayes.

Reception
A reviewer for Negro Digest stated: "From the opening track to the last Hubbard establishes and maintains a mood of excellence that literally explodes out to the listener. His solos are pregnant with quality and melody, and his technique is flawless. Unquestionably, this is the best by Freddie Hubbard to date. As for the music itself, it is all mainstream. There is no attempt at far-out-ness. Each tune is easy discernible, being buoyant for the most part with beauty and form". Michael G. Nastos of AllMusic added: "The manner in which this recording is programmed is thoughtful in that it lends to the diversity of the project, but is seamless from track to track. Dan Morgenstern's hefty liner notes also explain the concept behind this ambitious project, one which did not compare to any of Hubbard's other recordings in his career. Therefore it stands alone as one of the most unique productions in his substantive discography, and a quite credible initial go-round for Shorter as an orchestrator".

Track listing
All compositions by Freddie Hubbard except as indicated

 "Body and Soul"  (Edward Heyman, Robert Sour, Frank Eyton, Johnny Green) - 4:39
 "Carnival (Manhã de Carnaval)"  (Luiz Bonfá, Luigi Creatore, Hugo Peretti, George David Weiss) - 5:21
 "Chocolate Shake" (Duke Ellington, Paul Francis Webster) - 3:58
 "Dedicated to You" (Sammy Cahn, Saul Chaplin, Hy Zaret) - 3:24
 "Clarence's Place" - 3:31
 "Aries" - 3:07
 "Skylark" (Hoagy Carmichael, Johnny Mercer) - 4:34
 "I Got It Bad (And That Ain't Good)" (Duke Ellington, Paul Francis Webster) - 3:43
 "Thermo" - 4:15

Recorded on March 8 (#3, 7-8), March 11 (#2, 6, 9), & May 2 (#1, 4, 5), 1963.

Personnel
#1, 4, 5
Freddie Hubbard - trumpet
Wayne Shorter - tenor saxophone
Curtis Fuller - trombone
Eric Dolphy - alto saxophone, flute
Cedar Walton - piano
Reggie Workman - bass
Louis Hayes - drums

#2, 6, 9
Wayne Shorter - arranger, conductor
Freddie Hubbard, Clark Terry, Ernie Royal, Al DeRisi - trumpet
Eric Dolphy - alto saxophone, flute
Seldon Powell, Jerome Richardson - tenor saxophone
Charles Davis - baritone saxophone
Curtis Fuller, Melba Liston - trombone
Robert Powell - tuba
Bob Northern - French horn
Cedar Walton - piano
Reggie Workman - bass
Philly Joe Jones - drums

#3, 7, 8
Wayne Shorter - arranger, conductor
Freddie Hubbard, Ed Armour, Richard Williams - trumpet
Eric Dolphy - alto saxophone, flute
Bob Northern, Julius Watkins - French horns
Curtis Fuller, Melba Liston - trombone
Jerome Richardson - baritone saxophone
Cedar Walton - piano
Reggie Workman - bass
Philly Joe Jones - drums
Harry Cykman, Morris Stonzek, Arnold Eidus, Sol Shapiro, Charles McCracken, Harry Katzman, Harry Lookofsky, Gene Orloff, Julius Held, Raoul Poliakin - strings

References

1964 albums
Freddie Hubbard albums
Impulse! Records albums
Albums conducted by Wayne Shorter
Albums arranged by Wayne Shorter
Albums produced by Bob Thiele
Orchestral jazz albums